Peruvemba is a village and  gram panchayat near Chittur-Thathamangalam in the Palakkad district of Kerala, India. Within the village is the Ootukulangara Bhagavathy Temple.

Peruvemba is famous for the uniquely skilled craftsmen who manufacture and tune the leather-based percussion musical instruments such as Mridangam, Maddalam, Tabla, Timila, Chenda, Idakka etc. These families have been in this craft for about 200 years. Today, about 74 families in and around Peruvemba are continuing this tradition. Renowned musicians from different parts of the country visit Peruvemba for purchasing and maintenance of the instruments.

Demographics
 India census, Peruvemba had a population of 18,433 with 8,971 males and 9,462 females.

References 

Villages in Palakkad district
Gram panchayats in Palakkad district